Strong is a census-designated place in southeastern Northumberland County, Pennsylvania, United States. It is located in Mt. Carmel Township at the junction of Routes 54 and 61. The North Branch Shamokin Creek flows southwestward through Strong into the Shamokin Creek, a tributary of the Susquehanna River. It is served by the Mount Carmel post office, which uses the zip code of 17851.   As of the 2010 census, the population was 147 residents.

Census-designated places in Northumberland County, Pennsylvania